Gotlieb is a surname. Notable people with the name include:

 Allan Gotlieb (1928–2020), Canadian public servant and author
 Calvin Gotlieb (1921–2016), Canadian professor, widower of Phyllis
 Marcel Gotlieb or Gotlib (1934–2016), French cartoonist
 Phyllis Gotlieb (1926-2009), Canadian author and poet 
Ruth Gotlieb (died 2019), local politician in Wellington, New Zealand
 Sondra Gotlieb (born 1936), Canadian journalist and novelist

See also 
Gottlieb (name), given name and surname